The Donaufestival is an annual festival of music and performance that takes place each April in the Austrian state of Lower Austria. In the early years of  the festival, two towns were used as locations - Krems and Korneuburg.  Since 2007, however, only Krems has been used.

The festival tends to showcase avant-garde rock, performance art, noise and electronica artists.

Artists who have played at the Donaufestival

External links
Festival website

Music festivals in Austria
Tourist attractions in Lower Austria
Electronic music festivals in Austria